Elizabeth Anne Davis known professionally as Elizabeth A. Davis, is an American actress and musician known for her work in the musical Once, for which she was nominated for the Tony Award for Best Performance by a Featured Actress in a Musical in 2012.

Early life
Elizabeth Anne Davis was born in Dumas, Texas, and raised in Channing, Texas, the daughter of  Melody (née Brown) and Frank Davis. She also has a brother named Jonathan. Her father is the former superintendent of the Channing Independent School District, and both of her parents are involved in the arts. Her mother is a former speech coach and teacher who earned her master's degree in Speech Communication from West Texas A&M University in 1982. She graduated from Channing High School, received her Bachelor in Fine Arts degree from Baylor University and her Master of Fine Arts from Case Western Reserve University-Cleveland Play House acting program in Cleveland, Ohio. While at Baylor, Davis met her husband, Jordan Richard, a television director. Davis is an accomplished musician, having played the violin for over 18 years.

Career
Davis first started out her professional career as a college student playing the lead role in the Texas Musical Drama in the Palo Duro Canyon State Park.

Davis is seen as the Romanian "Nadia" on the New York-shot Taxi: Brooklyn. She was also seen in FOX's Fringe in the "Ability" episode and on One Life to Live.

Davis has appeared in numerous Off-Broadway and regional theatre productions, including the Off-Broadway production of Wolves as Kay at the 59E59 Theatre. She played the role of Sister James in Doubt at the Gulfshore Playhouse in Naples, Florida and starred as Blanche Dubois in a production of A Streetcar Named Desire at the Cleveland Playhouse. She played the role of Célimène in a New Jersey Shakespeare Festival production of The Misanthrope and has also understudied the lead female role in the New World Stages production of The 39 Steps. She starred in The Starship Astov at the Midtown International Theatre Festival, for which she was nominated for a MITF Best Actress award. Davis also starred as Emily Dickinson in Emily at Theatre Row for which she won the New York Innovative Theater Award for Outstanding Actress in a Lead Role.

Davis is best known for originating the role of Réza, the Czech roommate of leading lady Cristin Milioti in Once, a stage musical version of the Academy Award-winning film Once. Davis originated the role of Réza at the American Repertory Theatre at Harvard University and Off-Broadway at the New York Theatre Workshop. Her final performance as Réza in Once was on March 24, 2013.  Once opened on Broadway on March 18, 2012 and received 11 Tony nominations, including Best Musical. For this role she was nominated for a Tony Award for Best Featured Actress in a Musical. In May 2013, she joined Christopher Lloyd and composer, Duncan Sheik in Classic Stage Company's rare production of Bertolt Brecht's Caucasian Chalk Circle.

In April through May 2014, Davis starred in Four Last Things at the American Globe Theater.

Beginning in May 2022, Davis starred as Thomas Jefferson in the American Repertory Theater production of 1776.

Stage credits

Off-Broadway

• The Resistible Rise of Arturo Ui (2018), Giri

• My Name's Not Indian Joe (2018), Liz

• King Lear (2017), Goneril

• Dust Can't Kill Me (2016), Angelina

• Zorba! (2015), The Widow

• Allegro (2014), Jennie

• Four Last Things, (May, 2014), Jane

• Caucasian Chalk Circle, (April, 2013), Grusha

• Joe, (March, 2012), Playwright/Performer

• Once, (2011), Réza/Violinist

• The 39 Steps, (August 2010-February 2011), Woman (U/S – Performer)

• Wolves, (August 2010), Kay

• Dally with the Devil, (September 2011), Megan

• Emily, (September 2009), Emily Dickenson

• Of Mice and Men, (April 2008), Curley’s Wife

• The Cherry Orchard, (September–October 2008), Varya

• Grace, Sarah

Regional Theatre

• 1776, (2022), Thomas Jefferson

• Buzz, (2019), Buzz

• Indecent, (2019) The Female Middle (Actor 3)

• Rain, (2016), Anna

• Indian Joe, (2015), Liz/ Book, Music, Lyrics

• MacBeth Again, Becca

• Once, (March 2011), Réza

• The Devil’s Disciple, (2014), Judith

• The Misanthrope, (June–July 2011), Celimene

• Ride The Tiger, (October–November 2008), Judy

• Doubt, (February 2009), Sister James

• Opus, (February–March 2007), Grace

• Well, (April), Lisa U/S

• A Streetcar Named Desire, Stella

Film/TV

• New Amsterdam, (2019), Shana Davis

• Law & Order: SVU, (2019), Gemma Brooks

• The Wisdom Tooth, (2019), Susy

• Ben Platt: Older, (2019), Megan

• Trauma is a Time Machine, (2018), Georgia

• Law & Order: SVU, (2015), Alessandra Bay

• The Jim Gaffigan Show, (2015), Roxie

• Blue Bloods, (2015), Tatiana

• Taxi Brooklyn, (2014), Nadia

• Blur Circle, (2014), Heather

• Fringe, (2014), Joanne

• All My Children, (2011), Single Gal

• Nora Falls, (2007)

Special appearances

• The Today Show, (2012)

• The David Letterman Show, (2012)

• The Tony Awards, (2012)

• CBS Thanksgiving Day Parade, (2012)

Awards and nominations

References

External links

 

Living people
American musical theatre actresses
Baylor University alumni
Case Western Reserve University alumni
21st-century American actresses
1980 births
American stage actresses
People from Dumas, Texas
Actresses from Texas
Singers from Texas
People from Hartley County, Texas